Ranil  may refer to

Ranil Wickremesinghe, Prime Minister of Sri Lanka
Ranil Jayawardena, Sri Lankan British Politician
Ranil Abeynaike, Sri Lankan cricketer
Ranil Dhammika, Sri Lankan cricketer
Ranil Dias, Sri Lankan sailor

Sinhalese masculine given names